Chinatown Squad is a 1935 American mystery film directed by Murray Roth, written by Dore Schary and Ben Ryan  starring Lyle Talbot, Valerie Hobson, Hugh O'Connell, and Andy Devine, and featuring Leslie Fenton and Bradley Page. The film was released on May 31, 1935, by Universal Pictures.

Plot

Cast

Production
Chinatown Squad was shot was developed under the working titles of Frisco Lady and Frisco Nights. It was shot on location in San Francisco between March 18 and April 6, 1935.

Release
Chinatown Squad was distributed by Universal Pictures on May 20, 1935.

Reception
From contemporary reviews, Variety declared the film as "Usual whodunit pattern" and that the "cast works nicely for common good without gaining much personal distinction. Direction neat." Motion Picture Herald stated that the film was "a lively combination of mystery, aptly set in atmosphere of San Francisco's Chinatown, and melodrama [...] this picture has those elements which are salabale in that they appeal two basic and perennial interests of the motion picture going public, action and mystery." Film Daily found the film to be a "fair murder mystery" noting "nothing very pretentious, but a generally entertaining Chinatown melodrama that ought to satisfy the not too meticulous murder mystery fans." A review in Harrison's Reports concluded that the film's plot was "somewhat complicated and far-fetched. But because of the fact the identity of the murderer is not made known until the end one's attention is held fairly well."

From retrospective reviews, Michael R. Pitts in his book Thrills Untapped described the feature as a "speedy affair" that was "hampered by mediocre direction but enhanced by a good cast."

References

Footnotes

Sources

External links 
 

1935 films
American mystery films
1935 mystery films
Films shot in San Francisco
Universal Pictures films
American black-and-white films
Films directed by Murray Roth
1930s English-language films
1930s American films